Man of Two Worlds is a 1934 American pre-Code drama film directed by J. Walter Ruben and starring Francis Lederer, Elissa Landi and Henry Stephenson.

Plot
A British explorer to the Arctic hires an Eskimo guide for his expedition. Extremely skilled at his job, he has little knowledge of Western civilization. When he travels to London he falls in love with his employer's daughter, but also struggles to adjust to the different culture.

Box office
It lost $220,000. The film was a box-office disappointment for RKO.

Cast

 Francis Lederer as Aigo
 Elissa Landi as Joan Pemberton
 J. Farrell MacDonald as Michael
 Henry Stephenson as Sir Basil Pemberton
 Walter Byron as Eric Pager
 Forrester Harvey as Tim
 Ivan F. Simpson as Dr. Lott
 Lumsden Hare as Captain Swan
 Christian Rub as Knudson
 Émile Chautard as Natkusiak
 Steffi Duna as Guninana
 Sarah Padden as Olago

References

External links

 Man of Two Worlds: The Novel of a Stranger Galley Proofs at Dartmouth College Library

1934 films
1930s English-language films
1934 drama films
American drama films
American black-and-white films
RKO Pictures films
Films set in London
Films directed by J. Walter Ruben
1930s American films
Films scored by Bernhard Kaun
Films set in the Arctic